Dionysios Xenos (born 5 July 1995) is a Greek karateka. He won the gold medal in the men's 67 kg event at the 2021 European Karate Championships held in Poreč, Croatia. He also won the gold medal in his event at the 2022 Mediterranean Games held in Oran, Algeria.

Career 

He won one of the bronze medals in the under-21 men's 67 kg event at the 2016 EKF Cadet, Junior and under-21 Championships held in Limassol, Cyprus.

In June 2021, he competed at the World Olympic Qualification Tournament held in Paris, France hoping to qualify for the 2020 Summer Olympics in Tokyo, Japan. In October 2021, he won the gold medal in his event at the 2021 Mediterranean Karate Championships held in Limassol, Cyprus. A month later, he lost his bronze medal match in the men's 67 kg event at the World Karate Championships held in Dubai, United Arab Emirates.

He won the gold medal in the men's 67 kg event at the 2022 Mediterranean Games held in Oran, Algeria. In the final, he defeated Luca Maresca of Italy. He won the bronze medal in the men's kumite 67 kg event at the 2022 World Games held in Birmingham, United States.

Achievements

References

External links 
 

Living people
1995 births
Place of birth missing (living people)
Greek male karateka
Competitors at the 2022 Mediterranean Games
Mediterranean Games medalists in karate
Mediterranean Games gold medalists for Greece
World Games medalists in karate
World Games bronze medalists
Competitors at the 2022 World Games
21st-century Greek people